This is a list of Portuguese football transfers for the 2011 summer transfer window. The summer transfer window opened on 1 July and closed at midnight on 31 August.

Transfers

 Player who signs with his new club before the 1 July 2011 will officially join his club on 1 July 2011.

Notes and references

Football transfers summer 2011
Football Transfers Summer 2011
Lists of Portuguese football transfers